The Maluma  World Tour was the first headlining concert tour by Colombian reggaeton singer, Maluma, in support of his second studio album Pretty Boy, Dirty Boy (2015). The tour, which has visited Latin America, Spain, Europe, Asia, Oceania, Canada and the United States, began on May 14 in Ciudad Juárez, Mexico at Estadio Carta Blanca.

Opening acts
Nikky Mackliff 
Rocko & Blasty 
Danny Romero 
Miss Bolivia 
Jimena Barón

Set list
This set list is representative of the show on December 11, 2016 in Buenos Aires, Argentina. It is not representative of all concerts for the duration of the tour.

 "Borró Cassette"
 "Sin Contrato"
 "El Perdedor"
 "La Curiosidad"
 "Vente Pa' Ca"
 "Desde Esa Noche"
 "Addicted"
 "El Tiki"
 "Tengo Un Amor" / "Vuelo Hacia el Olvido"
 "Salgamos"
 "La Temperatura"
 "Chantaje"
 "La Bicicleta"
 "Cuatro Babys"
 "El Beso"
 "La Invitación"
 "Obsesión"
 "Carnaval"

Shows

Cancelled shows

Notes

References

Maluma concert tours
2016 concert tours
2017 concert tours